Cold Copper Tears is a fantasy novel by American writer Glen Cook, the third novel in his ongoing Garrett P.I. series.  The series combines elements of mystery and fantasy as it follows the adventures of private investigator Garrett.

Plot introduction
Garrett is a hardboiled detective living in the city of TunFaire, a melting pot of different races, cultures, religions, and species.  When people have problems, they often come to Garrett for help, but trouble has a way of finding Garrett on its own, whether he likes it or not.

Plot summary

Garrett is hired by a beautiful young woman calling herself Jill Craight to find out who has broken into her apartment and why.  Immediately after, a Magister Peridont comes to Garrett to try to get him to investigate the disappearance of some famous religious relics (Magister is the title given to the extremely rare wizard officially sanctioned by the largest and most powerful religious denomination in Tunfaire); Garrett respectfully declines. After getting attacked by a gang called the Vampires, Garrett goes to his old friend Maya, leader of the Doom, a all-girl gang, for advice.  Maya informs Garrett that Jill was a former member of the Doom, and that she is a chronic liar. Maya invites herself along to learn his trade.

Garrett turns up no leads and is not even quite sure what to investigate.  His one clue is some odd coins tying together Jill and the Vampires.  Garrett asks Peridont about the coins, then heads over to the Royal Assay office for help.  After learning nothing new, Garrett heads home, where he is visited again by Peridont, who informs him that Miss Craight was in fact his mistress, and now she is missing.

The story gets more complicated when Garrett visits crime lord Chodo Contague, whose house gets attacked by magical forces. Garrett saves Chodo's life. Outraged by this brazen assault, Chodo applies his considerable resources and henchmen to Garrett's case. Garrett and Maya take their search for Jill to the Tenderloin, the red-light district of TunFaire. When they return home, they find the same magical forces that attacked Chodo's mansion trying to tear apart Garrett's home.  After the Dead Man fends them off, he informs Garrett that another dead Loghyr is behind the magical attacks.  Eventually, Garrett and the Dead Man manage to tie together the church, the missing relics, the other Loghyr, and Jill Craight.

After discovering that Jill is hiding out in a church complex, Garrett and Morley break in and kidnap her and another of her lovers, a high status member of the Orthodox church.  Garrett assembles everyone of importance at his house, and he and the Dead Man uncover the motives of all the parties present.  Eventually, the relics are recovered and the other Loghyr is neutralized (though forcing a dead Loghyr to leave this existence requires a prolonged effort).

Characters  
Garrett
The Dead Man
Dean
Morley Dotes
Jill Craight
Magister Peridont
Saucerhead Tharpe
Maya
Crask and Sadler
Chodo Contague

Garrett P.I.
1988 American novels
American fantasy novels